Strelna is a municipal settlement in Petrodvortsovy District of the federal city of Saint Petersburg, Russia, about halfway between Saint Petersburg proper and Petergof, and overlooking the shore of the Gulf of Finland. Population:

History
Strelna was first mentioned in Cadastral surveying of Vodskaya pyatina in 1500, as the village of Strelna on Retse Strelne on the Sea in the churchyard Kipen Koporsky County.

After Treaty of Stolbovo these lands were part of Sweden, and in 1630 in Strelna appears as a baronial estate of Swedish politician Johan Skytte. The estate had a marina, a water mill, a pond, a greenhouse and a small house church.

Palace of Peter the Great
Formerly a Swedish chancellor's estate, Strelna was chosen by Peter the Great as a place for his future summer house in 1714. Jean Baptiste Le Blond, famous for his work with André Le Nôtre at Versailles, was commissioned to prepare designs for a palace and park. Le Blond envisaged the palace as a Château d'Eau, situated on a round island. The gardens were laid out to Le Blond's design, but the master's death prevented him from completing a more elaborate project for the palace.

In 1718, a temporary wooden palace was constructed in Strelna. It had been used by the Russian royalty as a sort of hunting lodge, and has been faithfully preserved to this day. After Le Blond's death, the commission to build the grand palace passed to Niccolo Michetti, a disciple of the Roman Carlo Fontana. A cornerstone was laid in June 1720, but next year it became apparent that the place was ill-adapted for installation of fountains, thus Peter decided to concentrate his attention on the nearby Peterhof. Disappointed, Michetti left Russia, and all works in Strelna were suspended.

On ascending the throne in 1741, Peter's daughter Elizabeth intended to complete her father's project. Her favourite architect Bartolomeo Rastrelli was asked to expand and aggrandize Michetti's design. But Rastrelli's attention was soon diverted to other palaces, in Peterhof and Tsarskoye Selo, so the Strelna palace stood unfinished until the end of the century.

Family home of the Konstantinovichi branch of the Romanovs 
In 1797, Strelna was granted to Grand Duke Konstantin Pavlovich (second son of Paul I) and his wife Grand Duchess Anna Feodorovna (aunt of Queen Victoria). Despite a great fire in 1803, the Konstantin Palace was completed by 1807. Andrei Voronikhin and Luigi Rusca were held responsible for architecture of its upper storeys. After Konstantin's death, the palace passed to his nephew, and the Konstantinovichi branch of the Romanov dynasty retained its ownership until the Revolution.

Vicissitudes in the 20th and 21st century

After 1917 the palace fell into decay: it was handed over to a child labour commune, then to a secondary school.  For a period during World War II, the Germans occupied Strelna and had a naval base there.  Some Decima Flottiglia MAS men and attack boats were brought from Italy and based at Strelna along with German Army boats.  Strelna Raid: Soviet commando frogmen attacked that base and destroyed 2 German army boats on 5 October 1943.

After the ravages of German occupation, only the palace walls were left standing; all interior decoration was gone.  No effective restoration had been undertaken until 2001 when Vladimir Putin ordered the palace to be converted into a presidential residence for Saint Petersburg.  The park with canals, fountains, and drawbridges was then recreated to Le Blond's original designs, complete with a water-bound pavilion by the sea shore.  In front of the palace is the equestrian statue of Peter the Great, originally installed in 1911 in Riga, while Mikhail Shemyakin's modernist sculpture of Peter's family strolling through the garden may be found closer to the sea shore.  Several rooms in the restored palace are dedicated to the poet Konstantin Romanov (who was born there).

In preparation for the celebration of the 300th anniversary of the founding Saint Petersburg, the Russian government decided to restore the palace and its grounds as a state conference center and presidential residence.  The renovated Konstantin Palace hosted more than 50 heads of state during the Saint Petersburg tercentenary celebrations in 2003.  Three years later, in July 2006 (July 15–17), it hosted the 32nd G8 summit.  During these summits, the world leaders were accommodated in 18 luxurious cottages by the sea-side.  Each of the cottages is named after a historic Russian town.  The early 19th-century stables were reconstructed into a four-star hotel for other visitors.  The 2013 G20 summit was held at the palace 5–6 September 2013.  The palace also held the qualifying draw for the 2018 FIFA World Cup, which took place in Russia. The palace hosted in 2021 the royal wedding between Grand Duke George Romanov and Victoria Bettarini, this been the first royal wedding to be held in the country in over a hundred years.

Other landmarks
Several other Romanov residences may be seen in the vicinity of the Konstantin Palace. The Baroque Znamenka, designed by Rastrelli, used to be a home to the Nikolaevichi branch of the Romanovs. The neoclassical Mikhailovka palace once belonged to the Mikhailovichi branch of the family.

Other landmarks in Strelna include a dacha of Mathilde Kschessinska and the ruined Maritime Monastery of St. Sergius, with numerous churches by Luigi Rusca. The monastery is noted as a burial place of the Zubov brothers and other Russian nobles. The imperial chancellor Alexander Gorchakov was interred here in 1883.

The Konstantin Palace, the Trinity Monastery, Mikhailovka, and Znamenka are parts of the World Heritage Site Saint Petersburg and Related Groups of Monuments.

See also
List of Baroque residences

References

External links

Strelna in Encyclopaedia of St. Petersburg
Official website of the Konstantin Palace
Views of Strelna I
Views of Strelna II
Views of Strelna III
Views of Strelna IV
Inside the palace I
Inside the palace II

 
Palaces in Saint Petersburg
Royal residences in Russia
Official residences in Russia
Presidential residences
Baroque architecture in Russia
Russian Baroque gardens
World Heritage Sites in Russia
Populated coastal places in Russia
Andrey Voronikhin buildings
Tsarskoselsky Uyezd
Petrodvortsovy District